Edward Anderson (May 31, 1864 – November 2, 1937) was an American brigadier general who served during World War I.

Early life 
Anderson was born on May 31, 1864 in Virginia. He graduated number thirty of forty-four from the United States Military Academy in 1888.

Career 
After graduation, Anderson was commissioned a second lieutenant of infantry but was switched to cavalry and performed frontier duty until 1895. He was in the Ghost Dance War of 1890 and served in the Santiago campaign in Cuba in 1891. For his service in Cuba, he received three Silver Star commendations. In 1898, he served in the Puerto Rican campaign.

He graduated from the Army War College in 1914.
 
From 1917 to 1920, Anderson commanded several camps and units around the United States. He received a promotion to the wartime rank of brigadier general on October 1, 1918. 
From March 19, 1919 to February 23, 1921, he commanded the 13th Cavalry and the post of Fort Clark, Texas. 
From April 3, 1921 to October 11, 1922, he commanded the Ninth Cavalry at Camp Stotsenberg in the Philippines, then he organized and commanded the 26th Cavalry of Philippine Scouts from October 1922 until January 6, 1923.

After thirty-eight years of service, Anderson retired as a colonel on April 28, 1923.

On June 21, 1930, his brigadier general's star was restored by an act of Congress.

Awards 
Silver Star

Personal life
He was married to Amelie (1896-1985).

Death and legacy
Edward Anderson died at the age of seventy-two on November 2, 1937.

References

Bibliography
Davis, Henry Blaine. Generals in Khaki. Raleigh, NC: Pentland Press, 1998.  

1864 births
1937 deaths
Burials at Arlington National Cemetery
United States Military Academy alumni
Recipients of the Silver Star
United States Army generals of World War I
American military personnel of the Spanish–American War
United States Army generals
United States Army War College alumni
Military personnel from Virginia
People born in the Confederate States